Ghanta Ghar literally means Hour House in Hindi–Urdu, implying Clock House or Clock tower. There are several Ghanta Ghars in India, Nepal and Pakistan.

India

 Ghantaghar in the center of Chandni Chowk, Delhi
 Ghanta Ghar in Jodhpur, Rajasthan
 Ghanta Ghar, Mirzapur

Nepal

 Ghanta Ghar in Nepal

Pakistan

 Ghanta Ghar in Multan, Punjab, Pakistan
 Ghanta Ghar in Peshawar, Khyber-Pakhtunkhwa, Pakistan
 Ghanta Ghar in Faisalabad, Punjab, Pakistan
 Ghanta Ghar in Sialkot, Punjab, Pakistan